Daniel Glimmenvall (born September 10, 1974) is a Swedish professional ice hockey player. He was formerly known as Daniel Johansson until 2009.

Currently, he is the captain of Rögle BK in the Swedish Allsvenskan.

References

External links

1974 births
Swedish ice hockey defencemen
New York Islanders draft picks
Rögle BK players
HV71 players
Lahti Pelicans players
Brynäs IF players
Adler Mannheim players
Living people